Kai Shan is a hill in Wang Chau, in the New Territories of Hong Kong, separating the new towns of Yuen Long and Tin Shui Wai.

Kai Shan is a private property and is owned by the Tang clan. According to reports, the hill is burned regularly to keep the vegetation low.

See also 

 Fung Lok Wai

References 

Mountains, peaks and hills of Hong Kong
Wang Chau (Yuen Long)